See separate lists:

List of tallest buildings and structures in Edinburgh
List of tallest buildings and structures in Glasgow

UK-wide lists:
List of tallest buildings in the United Kingdom
List of tallest structures in the United Kingdom
List of tallest buildings and structures in the United Kingdom by usage
List of tallest buildings by United Kingdom settlement

Tallest
Scotland